The famed Hodgdon Bros. in East Boothbay, Maine built Schooner Hindu in 1925. William H. Hand Jr., a renowned yacht designer, drew the plans for James W. Hall of New York City. The vessel's original name was the "Princess Pat," which is a sailor's song of Princess Patricia's Canadian Light Infantry Unit, currently stationed in Edmonton, Alberta. The schooner is a 79-foot (length overall) half-scale model of a 19th-century Grand Banks fishing vessel.

James W. Hall promptly sold the Princess Pat to Alphonsus Reybine, according to title records. After Reybine’s death, executor Martha Reynine sold it to T. Sloan Young in 1929. Young changed the name to “Saispas,” from the French “Je ne sais pas,” or “I don’t know.”

The boat participated in the 1930 Newport-Bermuda Race under Young's ownership. The vessel placed last, sailing alongside such other notable schooners of her era such as the John Alden-designed "Malabar X".

Roger W. Randall bought "Hindu" from Young. Nowell Ames bought her from Randall. Both sales happened in 1935. Nowell changed the boat's name to “Anna Lee Ames,”  before selling her to William A. Parker in 1938. Parker used the boat to trade spices between India and Boston from 1938-1940, and christened her “Hindu.”

The U.S. Navy commissioned "Hindu" during World War II, where she assisted the Coastal Patrol along the Eastern Seaboard. Log books indicate the navy men painted her gray, lined her with depth charges, mounted a machine gun on her deck and engaged a German U-boat on more than one occasion.

Archie A. Comstock owned the boat after the war for a short time before he sold it to Albert "Al" Avellar Jr. and partners in 1946.

Capt. Al Avellar of Provincetown, MA bought "Hindu" in 1946 and began sailing her as a passenger vessel there. Avellar eventually pioneered the whale watching industry in 1947 with what is purportedly the first trip on the eastern seaboard.

Captain Al Avellar sold the Hindu to Alfred "Al" Bates Tinker Jr.  Al Tinker Jr. Had been a deckhand aboard the Hindu, in his youth.  Al Tinker Jr. Learned many of life's lessons, under the tutelage of Captain Avellar.  Al Tinker Jr. continued the tradition of sailing the Hindu during the summer months, berthed at McMillan Wharf, in Provincetown, Ma.  Alfred Tinker Jr. began a new tradition for the Hindu, when he began providing sailings out of Key West, in the winter season. This proved to be popular, as the tradition is carried on to this day, by the Rowan family.

The boat changed hands a few times in the 1980s before a man named John Bennett became the owner. Bennett died aboard the boat and the schooner fell into disrepair.

Capt. Kevin "Foggy" Foley of Cape Cod and partners bought her in 2006. Then in his late 50s, Foley had sailed aboard "Hindu" as crew when he was 12 years old. Foley spent a year rebuilding the Hindu in East Boothbay with the help of friends and family.

She was used in the production of two Daniel Adams films that take place on Cape Cod: The Golden Boys in 2008 and The Lightkeepers in 2009.

Fairwinds Credit Union acquired "Hindu" in 2009.

William Rowan bought the schooner in 2011. The vessel is docked at the Key West Bight Marina, in Old Town Key West.

The schooner spends its year split between Key West, Florida in the winters and Provincetown, Massachusetts in the summers, going on regular day sails and sunset cruises.

See also
 List of schooners

References

External links
 

Schooners of the United States Navy
Individual sailing vessels
Tall ships of the United States
1925 ships
Ships built in Boothbay, Maine